Histone deacetylase 10 is an enzyme that in humans is encoded by the HDAC10 gene.

Acetylation of histone core particles modulates chromatin structure and gene expression. The opposing enzymatic activities of histone acetyltransferases and histone deacetylases, such as HDAC10, determine the acetylation status of histone tails (Kao et al., 2002).[supplied by OMIM]

Interactions
HDAC10 has been shown to interact with Histone deacetylase 2 and Nuclear receptor co-repressor 2.

See also
 Histone deacetylase

References

Further reading

External links 
 

EC 3.5.1